Georg Ferdinand Duckwitz (29 September 1904, Bremen – 16 February 1973) was a German diplomat. During World War II, he served as an attaché for Nazi Germany in occupied Denmark. He tipped off the Danes about the Germans' intended deportation of the Jewish population in 1943 and arranged for their reception in Sweden. Danish resistance groups subsequently rescued 95% of Denmark's Jewish population. Israel has designated Duckwitz as one of the Righteous Among the Nations .

Early life 

Duckwitz was born on 29 September 1904 in Bremen, Germany to an old patrician family in the Hanseatic City. After college, he began a career in the international coffee trade.

Career 
From 1928 to 1932 Duckwitz lived in Copenhagen, Denmark. In November 1932 he met Gregor Strasser, the leader of the leftist branch of the German nationalistic Nazi Party, in Bremen. Over the course of their conversation, Duckwitz found that "elements of Scandinavian socialism [were] connected with nationalistic feelings" and subsequently decided to enroll in the party. On 1 July 1933, he joined the Nazi Party's Office of Foreign Affairs in Berlin. Over the course of his tenure, he became increasingly disillusioned by Nazi politics. In a 4 June 1935 letter to Alfred Rosenberg, the head of the office, he wrote, "My two-year employment in the Reichsleitung [i.e. executive branch] of the [Nazi Party] has made me realize that I am so fundamentally deceived in the nature and purpose of the National Socialist movement that I am no longer able to work within this movement as an honest person". Around the same time, the Gestapo secret police made its first notes on Duckwitz after he had sheltered three Jewish women in his Kurfürstendamm apartment during a local anti-Semitic Sturmabteilung event. He later wrote that he had then become "a fierce opponent of this [Nazi] system".

He eventually left the Office of Foreign Affairs to work for the Hamburg America Line shipping company. In 1939, he was assigned to the German embassy in Copenhagen as a maritime attaché.

Rescue of Jews in Denmark 

After 1942, Duckwitz worked with the Nazi Reich representative Werner Best, who organised the Gestapo. On 11 September 1943 Best told Duckwitz about the intended roundup of all Danish Jews on 1 October. Duckwitz travelled to Berlin to attempt to stop the deportation through official channels. That failed, and he flew to Stockholm two weeks later, ostensibly to discuss the passage of German merchant ships. There, he contacted Swedish Prime Minister Per Albin Hansson and asked whether Sweden would be willing to receive Danish Jewish refugees. In a couple of days, Hansson promised them a favourable reception.

Back in Denmark on 29 September, Duckwitz contacted the Danish social democrat Hans Hedtoft and notified him of the intended deportation. Hedtoft warned the head of the Jewish community, C. B. Henriques, and the acting chief rabbi, Marcus Melchior, who spread the warning. Sympathetic Danes in all walks of life organized a mass escape of over 7,200 Jews and 700 of their non-Jewish relatives by sea to Sweden.

Afterward, Duckwitz went back to his official duties.

Later life 
After the war, Duckwitz remained in the German foreign service. In 1955 to 1958, he served as West German ambassador to Denmark and later as the ambassador to India. When Willy Brandt became Foreign Minister in 1966, he made Duckwitz Secretary of State in West Germany's Foreign Office. After Brandt became Chancellor, he ordered Duckwitz to negotiate an agreement with the Polish government. Brandt's work culminated in the 1970 Treaty of Warsaw. Duckwitz worked as Secretary of State until his retirement in 1970. On 21 March 1971, the Israeli government named him Righteous Among the Nations and included him in the Yad Vashem memorial. He died two years later, at 68.

Legacy
Duckwitz was portrayed by Patrick Malahide in the film Miracle at Midnight.

References

External links

Yad Vashem honouring of Georg Ferdinand Duckwitz as Righteous among the Nations – an article from the Encyclopedia of the Holocaust
Georg Ferdinand Duckwitz – his activity to save Jews' lives during the Holocaust, at Yad Vashem website
The tip-off from a Nazi that saved my grandparents
 

1904 births
1973 deaths
20th-century Freikorps personnel
German Righteous Among the Nations
Denmark in World War II
People from Bremen
Ambassadors of West Germany to Denmark
Ambassadors of West Germany to India
Officials of Nazi Germany
Grand Crosses with Star and Sash of the Order of Merit of the Federal Republic of Germany
Nazi Party members
German resistance to Nazism
Nazi-era German officials who resisted the Holocaust